Richie Gray is a former Scottish rugby player, and television presenter.

Gray fronted STV's coverage of the 2007 Rugby World Cup, and also presented STV's weekly programme, Scotsport Rugby Sunday, with all the latest news and highlights, including footage of Edinburgh and Glasgow Warriors, club rugby and the women's games. The show began on Sunday 11 November 2007 and lasted only one series.

Gray has also been a coach for the Springboks and the Scotland rugby union team.

References

External links
Rugby at stv.tv

Living people
Scottish television presenters
Year of birth missing (living people)